Education in Crawley, West Sussex is co-ordinated by West Sussex County Council. Since 2004, provision for compulsory education has been made wholly through primary and secondary schools, following the closure of the town's Middle schools earlier that year. Each neighbourhood in the town has at least one Primary school, while Secondary schools are distributed around the town on larger campuses.

Primary schools

Secondary schools

All-through schools

Special Educational Needs School

Further education
Each of the local Secondary schools has a Sixth form attached. Further education is also provided at Central Sussex College formerly opened as Crawley Technical College in 1958.

Former schools
Note: where schools have been replaced by a school with a comparable name, these are not recorded, e.g. Bewbush Middle School is now Bewbush Primary School.

References

External links

List of educational establishments in Crawley West Sussex County Council
Schools in Crawley data provided by EduBase, the Department for Education

Buildings and structures in Crawley
Schools in West Sussex